Hygrophoropsis ochraceolutea is a species of fungus in the family Hygrophoropsidaceae. It was described in 1991 from collections made in Sardinia.

References

External links

Hygrophoropsidaceae
Fungi described in 1991
Fungi of Europe